Dayramir González Vicet is a Cuban pianist, composer, arranger, and producer.

In 2004 he formed his own project Dayramir & Habana enTRANCe, which has performed internationally since its inception.

While still attending Berklee College of Music, in 2012, he was selected by Chucho Valdés, a mentor to González, to be part of Carnegie Hall's Voices of Latin America series, where he represented, along with Aldo López-Gavilán the young generation of Afro-Cuban jazz pianists. According to his website, he now lives in the South Bronx.

Awards and recognition

Featured in the award-winning book Danzón: Circum-Caribbean Dialogues in Music and Dance, he is considered a main proponent of continuing the tradition of Cuban music as he combines "formal elements of standard jazz practice...with elements of the danzón."  He is among the few Cuban jazz artists rescuing the danzón and "reinventing the genre on the basis of diverse constructions of identity."

Discography
 2007: Dayramir & Habana enTRANCe (Colibrí Productions)
 2008: Solo tú y yo - Giraldo Piloto & Klimax (EGREM)
 2009: Todo Está Bien - Giraldo Piloto & Klimax (Bis Music)
 2011: Octave (Jazz Revelation Records)
 2018: The Grand Concourse (Machat Records)

References

External links
 
 https://web.archive.org/web/20170111153247/http://www.decubajazz.cult.cu/Gonz%C3%A1lez-Vicet,-Dayramir-id=169

Living people
Afro-Cuban jazz pianists
Latin jazz pianists
Cuban jazz pianists
Year of birth missing (living people)
21st-century pianists
Berklee College of Music alumni